The European Middleware Initiative (EMI) is a computer software platform for high performance distributed computing. It is developed and distributed directly by the EMI project. It is the base for other grid middleware distributions used by scientific research communities and distributed computing infrastructures all over the world especially in Europe, South America and Asia. EMI supports broad scientific experiments and initiatives, such as the Worldwide LHC Computing Grid (for the Large Hadron Collider).

The EMI middleware is a cooperation among three general purpose grid platforms, the Advanced Resource Connector, gLite and UNICORE and the dCache storage software.

Purpose
The purpose of the EMI distribution is to consolidate, harmonize and support the original software platforms, evolve and extend them. Redundant or duplicate services resulting from the merging are deprecated, in favour of new services added to satisfy user requirements or specific consolidation needs, standardizing and developing common interfaces. These include the adoption of a common structure for accounting, resource information exchange or authentication and authorization.

Input for the development activities is taken from users, infrastructures projects, standardization initiatives or changing technological innovations. The software products will be adapted as necessary to comply with standard open-source guidelines to facilitate the integration in mainstream operating system distributions.

Collaborations
A cooperation with FutureGrid, a US distributed testbed for Clouds, Grids and high-performance computing, was announced in December 2011.

In January 2012, the EMI project formalized a partnership with the iMarine project to create an open data e-infrastructure for fisheries management and marine conservation.

Users
By 2008 the EMI software distribution provided most of the middleware components which support the execution and completion of the millions of computational jobs handled by the 350 centers of the European Grid Infrastructure and the tens of petabytes of data transfers occurring between the storage systems of those centers.

EMI middleware was used in the WLCG infrastructure which supports, for example, the search for the Higgs boson (the God Particle) and new types of matter searches of the physicists at LHC together with other research in astronomy, biology, computational chemistry and other sciences.

License
There is no common EMI license though all licenses used by EMI are open-source. Each product has a long history behind its own license. Most are Apache or BSD.

dCache products are released under the dCache Software License but they adopted the Affero General Public License from 1 January 2012.

Products
The EMI products (components of the release) can be grouped in four categories (areas): computing, data, security and infrastructure.

The first release of the software is composed of 56 products packaged for Scientific Linux 5 (32, 64bit).

The second release is also made of 56 products which are available for Scientific Linux 5 64bit and Scientific Linux 6 64bit. A subset of services is also available for Debian 6 64bit with more planned with the updates.

The third and final release contains 61 products for the Scientific Linux 5 64bit (480 packages), Scientific Linux 6 64bit (474 packages) and Debian 6 (233 packages) Linux distributions. All components are supported on the Scientific Linux platforms while some are not on Debian.

Releases
EMI releases are of two types. Major releases include most if not all components and Component Releases which is related to a single product.
A collection of components may be released as an update to a major release.

Major releases
Major releases are delivered once per year. Three planned major releases were named after European mountains.

Full Support: updates are released to address issues in the code and new features are provided (lasts 12 months)

Standard Updates: updates are released to address issues in the code but no new features are provided (lasts 6 months)

Security Updates and Support: only updates targeting security vulnerabilities are provided (6 months)

As older versions of the EMI products are superseded by newer versions, an end-of-life announcement is made which coincides with the end of the security updates and support period.

As of May 2013, 24 updates were released for EMI 1 Kebnekaise, 13 for EMI 2 Matterhorn and 3 for EMI 3 Monte Bianco.

Component releases
Minor Releases: contain interface or functional changes that are backwards-compatible with those of the current major release. They are issued a few times per year.

Revision Releases: available every week or two weeks. They contain only bug fixes.

Emergency Releases: contain only very specific bug fixes, typically security-related and are available as need, using emergency release procedures.

References

External links
 EMI Project official website
 EMI software repository
 ARC official website
 dCache official website
 gLite official website
 UNICORE official website
 EGI official website
 FutureGrid official website

Middleware
Grid computing products
Grid computing projects
Information technology organizations based in Europe